Eurogroove were a Eurodance act active in the 1990s, led by producer Tetsuya Komuro, in collaboration with FKB (Phil France, Tony King and Bozidar Ristic), and fronted by vocalist Daz and rappers Charles and Steve.

They were particularly successful in Japan and the United Kingdom, where they scored three top 40 hits in 1995 with "Move Your Body", "Dive to Paradise" and "It's on You (Scan Me)".

Discography

Albums
 In the Groove (1996)

Singles

Japan Releases 
 "Move Your Body Baby" (1994)
 "Don't Keep Me Hangin' On" (1994)
 "Dive To Paradise" [feat.  Silvia] (1994)
 "Rescue Me" (1995)- #1 Japanese International Singles Chart.
 "Boogie Woogie" [feat. Dannii Minogue] (1995) - #1 Japanese International Singles Chart.
 "Let's Go" (1995)

UK Releases 
 "Move Your Body" (1995) - #29 UK
 "Dive to Paradise" (1995) - #31 UK
 "It's on You (Scan Me)" (1995) - #25 UK
 "Move Your Body" [Remix] (1996) - #44 UK
 "Rescue Me" - Completely different recording than the Japanese release (1996) - #99 UK

References

English dance music groups
British Eurodance groups